In gynaecology, Sims' vaginal speculum is a double-bladed surgical instrument used for examining the vagina and cervix. It was developed by J. Marion Sims out of pewter spoon, but nowadays it is manufactured out of stainless steel or plastic. The plastic speculum is disposable, but the stainless steel one is not. Therefore, the stainless steel speculum should be sterilized before each use. Sims' speculum is inserted into the vagina to retract posterior vaginal wall. It gives more exposure of the vaginal walls than Cusco's Speculum and therefore is preferred for gynaecological surgeries. It is possible to slide the instrument around the vaginal wall to enable better visualization. The groove in the middle of Sims' speculum allows free flow of secretions and blood to the outside, thereby keeping the area dry. Sims' speculum is available in various sizes, and the size appropriate to the vaginal dimensions of the woman is chosen for use. The disadvantage of Sims' speculum is that it is not self-retaining. The examiner might want to use an anterior wall retractor in addition to Sims' speculum for better visualization of the cervix.

See also
Speculum
Instruments used in obstetrics and gynecology

References

Further reading
 

Surgical instruments
Gynaecology
J. Marion Sims